is a Japanese former professional baseball catcher in Japan's Nippon Professional Baseball. he played for the Hanshin Tigers from 20087 to 2016.

External links

NPB stats

1985 births
Living people
People from Atsugi, Kanagawa
Baseball people from Kanagawa Prefecture
Japanese baseball players
Nippon Professional Baseball catchers
Hanshin Tigers players